While sensemaking has been studied by other disciplines under other names for centuries, in information science and computer science the term "sensemaking" has primarily marked two distinct but related topics. Sensemaking was introduced as a methodology by Brenda Dervin in the 1980s and to human–computer interaction by PARC researchers Daniel Russell, Mark Stefik, Peter Pirolli and Stuart Card in 1993.

In information science, the term is often written as "sense-making". In both cases, the concept has been used to bring together insights drawn from philosophy, sociology, and cognitive science (especially social psychology). Sensemaking research is therefore often presented as an interdisciplinary research programme.

As a process

Sensemaking can be described as a process of developing sophisticated representation and organizing information to serve a task, for example, decision-making and problem-solving (Russell et al., 1993). Gary A. Klein and colleagues (Klein et al. 2006b) conceptualize sensemaking as a set of processes that is initiated when an individual or organization recognizes the inadequacy of their current understanding of events.

Sensemaking is an active two-way process of fitting data into a frame (mental model) and fitting a frame around the data. Neither data nor frame comes first; data evoke frames and frames select and connect data. When there is no adequate fit, the data may be reconsidered or an existing frame may be revised. This description resembles the recognition-metacognition model (Cohen et al., 1996), which describes the metacognitive processes that are used by individuals to build, verify, and modify working models (or "stories") in situational awareness to account for an unrecognised situation. Such notions also echo the processes of assimilation and accommodation in Jean Piaget's theory of cognitive development (e.g., Piaget, 1972, 1977).

As methodology

Brenda Dervin (Dervin, 1983, 1992, 1996) has investigated individual sensemaking, developing theories about the "cognitive gap" that individuals experience when attempting to make sense of observed data. Because much of this applied psychological research is grounded within the context of systems engineering and human factors, it aims to answer the need for concepts and performance to be measurable and for theories to be testable. Accordingly, sensemaking and situational awareness are viewed as working concepts that enable researchers to investigate and improve the interaction between people and information technology. This perspective emphasizes that humans play a significant role in adapting and responding to unexpected or unknown situations, as well as recognized situations. Dervin's work has largely focused on developing philosophical guidance for method, including methods of substantive theorizing and conducting research (Naumer, C. et al., 2008).

In human–computer interaction

After a seminal paper on sensemaking in the human–computer interaction (HCI) field was published in 1993 (Russell et al., 1993), there was a great deal of activity around the understanding of how to design interactive systems for sensemaking, and workshops on sensemaking were held at prominent HCI conferences (e.g., Russell et al., 2009).

See also
 Augmented cognition

References (information science)

Information science